Reona Bhola is a village near Sirhind in Punjab, India. It is located on the bank of the Bhakhra Canal. It has an Elementary School and its own water supply system.

This Village is an example of the unity and diversity of India, as there is a Mandir, Gurdwara, Church and Masjid of Peer baba Lalan wala ji (Nigahe wala ji).

The local temperature is slightly cooler than nearby areas because of Bhakhra canal.

Population Data:
    
Number of houses = 184

Total Population: 851

Male Population: 453

Female Population: 398

Distance from nearby cities:-

Sirhind 13.5 km.
Rajpura 16 km.
Ludhiana 72 km.
Ambala 46 km.

Fatehgarh Sahib
Villages in Fatehgarh Sahib district